Jonah Berger is a professor at the Wharton School of the University of Pennsylvania, an internationally best-selling author, and an expert on change, word of mouth, viral marketing, social influence, and how products, ideas, and behavior catch on. He has published over 50 articles in academic journals, and has written for The New York Times, Wall Street Journal, and Harvard Business Review. Over a million copies of his books Contagious: Why Things Catch On, Invisible Influence: The Hidden Forces that Shape Behavior, and The Catalyst: How to Change Anyone's Mind are in print in over 35 countries around the world.

Berger often keynotes major conferences and events like SXSW and Cannes Lions, advises various early-stage companies, and consults for organization's like Apple, Google, Nike, Amazon, GE, 3M, and the Gates Foundation.

Biography 
Berger grew up in Washington, DC and Chevy Chase, Maryland and attended the magnet program at Montgomery Blair High School in Silver Spring. He attended Stanford University and earned a B.A. in Human Judgment and Decision Making in 2002, and a Ph.D. in marketing from Stanford’s Graduate School of Business in 2007. Berger writes about psychology, marketing, social influence, and virality as a LinkedIn Influencer.

Publications

Books
The Catalyst: How to Change Anyone's Mind
Invisible Influence: The Hidden Factors that Shape Behavior, Simon & Schuster, 2016
Contagious: Why Things Catch On, Simon & Schuster, 2013
Amazon Best book of 2013
Audible Best Audiobook of 2013

Selected articles
Berger, Jonah and Grant Packard (2018), “Are Atypical Things More Popular?” Psychological Science, 29(7), 1178-1184.
Packard, Grant and Jonah Berger (2017), “How Language Shapes Word of Mouth’s Impact,” Journal of Marketing Research, 54(4), 572-588.
Akpinar, Ezgi and Jonah Berger (2015), “Drivers of Cultural Evolution: The Case of Sensory Metaphors,” Journal of Personality and Social Psychology, 109 (1), 20-34.
Berger, Jonah (2014) “Word-of-Mouth and Interpersonal Communication: A Review and Directions for Future Research” Journal of Consumer Psychology, 24(4), 586-607.
Berger, Jonah and Katy Milkman (2012), “What Makes Online Content Viral?” Journal of Marketing Research, 49 (2), 192-205.
Berger, Jonah and Raghuram Iyengar (2013), “Communication Channels and Word of Mouth: How the Medium Shapes the Message,” Journal of Consumer Research, October.
Zoey Chen and Jonah Berger (2013), “When, Why, and How Controversy Causes Conversation,” Journal of Consumer Research, October.
Berger, Jonah, Eric Bradlow, Alex Braunstein, and Yao Zhang (2012), “From Karen to Katie: Using Baby names to Study Cultural Evolution” Psychological Science, 23 (10), 1067-1073.
Sela, Aner and Jonah Berger (2012), “Decision Quicksand: How Trivial Choice Suck Us In” Journal of Consumer Research, 39(2), 360-370.
Berger, Jonah and Eric Schwartz (2011), “What Drives Immediate and Ongoing Word of Mouth?” Journal of Marketing Research, October, 869-880.
Berger, Jonah and Devin Pope (2011), “Can Losing Lead to Winning?” Management Science, 57(5), 817-827.
Berger, Jonah, Alan T. Sorensen, and Scott J. Rasmussen (2010), “Positive Effects of Negative Publicity: When Negative Reviews Increase Sales,” Marketing Science, 29(5), 815-827.
Berger, Jonah and Gael Le Mens (2009), “How Adoption Speed Affects the Abandonment of Cultural Tastes,” Proceedings of the National Academy of Sciences, 106, 8146-8150.
Berger, Jonah, Marc Meredith, and S. Christian Wheeler (2008), “Contextual Priming: Where People Vote Affects How They Vote,” Proceedings of the National Academy of Sciences, 105 (26), 8846-8849.
Berger, Jonah and Gráinne M. Fitzsimons (2008), “Dogs on the Street, Pumas on Your Feet: How Cues in the Environment Influence Product Evaluation and Choice,” Journal of Marketing Research, 45(1), 1-14.
Berger, Jonah and Chip Heath (2007), “Where Consumers Diverge from Others: Identity-Signaling and Product Domains,” Journal of Consumer Research, 34(2), 121-134.

Awards 
The American Marketing Association (AMA) Top 5 Most Productive Researchers in Marketing
The Association for Consumer Research (ACR) Early Career Award for Contribution to Consumer Research
The Society for Consumer Psychology (SCP) Early Career Award for Distinguished Scientific Contributions to Consumer Psychology
The Wharton School of the University of Pennsylvania Iron Professor Award for Awesome Faculty Research
The Wharton School of the University of Pennsylvania MBA Teaching Commitment and Curricular Innovation Award, 2011
New York Times, Year in Ideas

References

External links 
Official site
Faculty page at Wharton
NPR Interview with Jonah Berger

Wharton School of the University of Pennsylvania faculty
American marketing people
American business writers
Stanford University alumni
Living people
Stanford Graduate School of Business alumni
Year of birth missing (living people)